Beige Planet Mars is a 1998 novel by Lance Parkin and Mark Clapham  featuring the fictional archaeologist Bernice Summerfield. The New Adventures were a spin-off from the long-running British science fiction television series Doctor Who.

Plot
The novel is set on Mars and draws on previous depictions of the planet in the New Adventures.

External links

1998 British novels
1998 science fiction novels
Virgin New Adventures
Novels by Lance Parkin
Novels by Mark Clapham
Novels set on Mars